The Axe Apollo space campaign was a private space venture which planned to provide sub-orbital spaceflight for 23 people on board the Lynx, a spacecraft still in development at the time of the launch of the venture. It was initiated as part of a marketing campaign by advertising firm Bartle Bogle Hegarty (BBH) London to promote the Axe Apollo line of the men's deodorant brand Axe.

If the venture pushed through it would have accomplish milestones; such as the first spaceflight of nationals from Egypt, Norway, Philippines, and Thailand, as well as the first spaceflight by a Black South African.

However the plan of Unilever to send people to space did not push through due to XCOR Aerospace, the developer of the Lynx going bankrupt in 2017.

Background
British–Dutch company Unilever initiated a marketing campaign on 9 January 2013 which promised to provide sub-orbital spaceflight to 22 people on board the Lynx spacecraft of XCOR Aerospace which was still under development at the time of the promotion. The campaign is intended to advertise the Axe Apollo, a new product under the men's deodorant brand Axe (which is also known as Lynx in Australia, New Zealand, Ireland, and the United Kingdom). The deadline to enter was on 9 February 2013.

The involvement of astronaut Buzz Aldrin as an endorser of the campaign was noted to have given legitimacy to Axe's sub-orbital spaceflight bid. The campaign for the brand meant for a male demographic also received allegations of sexism although women were also eligible to enter Axe's competition.

Marketing

The bid to give tickets to 22 people for sub-orbital spaceflights on the Lynx was part of a marketing campaign by the London office of advertising firm Bartle Bogle Hegarty (BBH) to promote the "Axe Apollo", a new product under Unilever's men's deodorant line Axe. For its local campaign in the United States, Unilever aired a promotion for its space campaign at the 2013 Super Bowl.

Selection process

Initial selection contest
On 9 January 2013 the "Axe Apollo Space Academy" (AASA) contest was launched in collaboration with American astronaut Buzz Aldrin to determine the 22 people Unilever would be given sub-orbital spaceflights on board the Lynx. The competition was opened to both male and female aspirants in at least 60 countries, where people could enter either through social media or by entering promo codes from purchasing Axe products. Contestants entered by a writing an essay about why they think they deserve to be selected as one of the winners of the campaign, while other participants voted for the contestant of their choice.

Shortlisting of entries
107 individuals coming from 60 countries were shortlisted from the campaign's competition entrants. The 107 people underwent four-day training camp at a facility at the Kennedy Space Center in Florida which was dubbed as the "Axe Apollo Space Academy" for marketing purposes. The contestants underwent tests on mental aptitude, physical fitness, and air combat. The selection process had variations; with some entrants in direct competition with other entrants from their own country while some did not.

The winners of the campaign was selected by a panel led by Buzz Aldrin.

Winners

Planned flights

Winners of the campaign would be flown to space one at a time on board the Lynx aircraft, which had a planned capacity of two crew members; one each for the pilot and another passenger. The launch site of the spacecraft would be a runway in Curaçao. The plan was for the flights to take place as early as 2014.

Aftermath
The flights under the Axe Apollo program never took place. As of 2015, Unilever said that it remains in contact with XCOR Aerospace, the developer of the Lynx spacecraft. However XCOR folded in 2017, and the development of the Lynx spacecraft was never completed. Consequentially, other prospective space tourists outside the Axe campaign who bought tickets to fly on the Lynx were not able to board the spacecraft.

Unilever also acknowledged trademark infringement after launching the marking campaign offering $350,000 to the state commission that runs the U.S Space and Rocket Center in Huntsville, Alabama, owners of the "Space Camp" trademark.  The commission's board rejected the offer calling it "unacceptable" instructing its attorney to continue negotiation "to find a compensation figure both sides can accept". Past "Space Camp" licensing agreements have been valued at $1.5 million.

See also
Mars One
Virgin Galactic

References

Super Bowl commercials
Projects established in 2013
2013 in spaceflight
Advertising campaigns
XCOR Aerospace
Unilever
Cancelled space missions
Commercial spaceflight
Suborbital human spaceflights